Gary Howe is a British comedy writer and performer, most noted for working in the sketch show Smack the Pony and the sitcom Green Wing. He has had a working partnership with fellow writer Richard Preddy since 1988.

Renowned zoologist and bargain hunter Mark Cartwright once described Gary as "the funniest thing with two legs."

Performer 

All Aboard The Cat Bus on Channel 4's Comedy Lab - (1999)
House Of Rock - (2000–02)
Green Wing - (2004-2006) Playing a lodger.

Writer 

ChuckleVision - (1987–Present)
Birds Of A Feather - (1989–98)
Smith and Jones - (1989–98)
Tracey Ullman: A Class Act - (1993)
Shooting Stars - (1993-2002)Harry Enfield And Chums - (1994-97)The Fast Show - (1994-2000)Ant and Dec Unzipped - (1997)Sunnyside Farm - (1997)We Know Where You Live - (1997)The Morwenna Banks Show - (1998)The Zig and Zag Show - (1998)All Aboard The Cat Bus on Channel 4's Comedy Lab - (1999)Smack the Pony - (1999-2003)Shooting Stars - (2001)House Of Rock - (2000-02)Tv to Go - (2000-02)Green Wing - (2004-2006)The All Star Comedy Show, later Monkey Trousers - (2004-05)Man Stroke Woman - (2005-Present)Stupid'' - (2005–Present)

References

External links 
Gary Howe in BBC Comedy Guide
Green Wing "microsite" at Channel4.com
British Sitcom Guide  Green Wing writers.

British comedy writers
Living people
Year of birth missing (living people)
Alumni of the University of Kent